The Church of St Margaret is a 14th-century grade II* listed church near Bowers Gifford, Essex.

The church is notable for being surrounded by fields and marshland, but immediately adjacent to the main C2C railway line to London.

In common with many Essex churches it features a wooden bell-cot surmounting a stone tower.

Location 
Situated two miles east from Basildon in south Essex separated from the River Thames by Canvey Island, originally a remote village surrounded by estuary marshes, the church sits a mere 10 metres above sea level.

History 

In 1086 the Domesday Book stated Bowers Gifford had four land holders, four ploughs and sheep; a wooden Saxon church stood at that time.

St Margaret's Church dates back to 1350; officially the Church is known as St Margaret's of Antioch.

Exterior history 
A two-stage stone tower supported by a heavy diagonal buttress on the south west corner, on the south west side a semi-circular relieving arch, south nave with side buttresses, the nave has four windows dating from the 15th century, a crypt is beneath the church, not having been opened for two centuries.

The western bell tower and steeple were built in the early 16th century, and over the following centuries the church had fallen into a state of neglect, and during the 18th century was used as a barn. The church structure came under a major restoration programme between 1867 and 1870. The south porch was added in 1910, and in 1923 and 1930 further restorations took place, Restoration architects J. Peacock and Sir Charles Nicholson were responsible. The most recent restoration took place in 2000, when the steeple was renovated and reclad with cedar shingles.

Interior history 
Square plaster panel in nave south wall depicting Virgin and Child, 14th century.

Double wave-moulded tower arch, early 16th-century timber frame for steeple; frame consists of four heavy oak square posts and a heavy middle rail, which are cross braced.

Nave and chancel in form of a canted and boarded barrel roof, with moulded and transverse ribs. Eastern two bays over the altar elaborated with cusped and decorated cross braces.

A 17th-century pyramid font cover, and a hexagonal pulpit donated in 1924 from Harrow School Chapel, dated 1857.

Chancel stalls dated 1926, pews in nave dated 1929-1931,and a timber altar rail dated 1941.

Church grounds and construction 
St Margaret is built in the Perpendicular style, consisting of a chancel (21 ft by 19 ft) and nave (40 ft by 18 ft), south porch and western tower (10 ft square).

St Margaret's is built from Kentish Ragstone rubble, with flint and Roman brick, the dressings are in Reigate stone, the roofs covered in slate.

The west tower is of the early 16th century in date, and built in two stages, surmounted by a timber super structure, the low octagonal spire was added in the Tudor period and is clad in cedar wooden shingles.

The west tower has three bells, which can be reached by climbing 25 steeply steps. The bells themselves date to 1380 by William Burford, and is inscribed "Sit Nomen Domini Benedictum", the second bell dated 1400 by Robert Burford is inscribed "Sancta Katerina Ora Pro Nobis", and are some of the oldest in Essex, and are still rung regularly.

Sir John Giffard and the Giffard family 
The first mention of Giffard family in Bowers Gifford was in 1242 when William de la Dune and his wife granted a William Giffard land in the village and its marshes, William Giffard was a direct descendant of William the Conqueror, he and his heirs became Lords of Essex Marshes, and would supply the King with lard and bacon, on 27 December 1292 the royal court granted the Giffard family the right to hold a fair on this date, and additional markets every Friday and it should be on the Vigil feast and morrow of St Margaret's to whom the parish church was dedicated, finally the right to warren was confirmed.

Sir John Giffard, a knight in 1324, was exempted for bearing arms for one year by the King, the Giffard family were in debt from 1329, in 1337 Sir John handed over all his possessions to his wife Alice and his son John, and by 1349 both Sir John and his son had died, a year earlier the Black Death had crossed over from France, its likely that both Johns died of the Black Death.

The Church of St Margaret was built around 1350 by the Giffard family.

Sir John Giffard monumental brass 

Set within the church along the north wall of the chancel lies the 7' stone slab and damaged monumental brass effigy of Sir John Giffard who died in 1348. This brass is of great historic importance, and is the earliest monumental brasses known in the whole of Essex apart from one, that of Sir William Fitzralph in Pebmarsh church, circa 1330. What makes it so unique is the period lack of period armour, the Jupon or field dress is the earliest to appear on any Monumental Brass. The Jupon is combined with chain mail stockings, unprotected by Jambs or Solievets, this could be due to the debt issues of the Giffard family.

The dimensions are life size in scale, making Sir John around 6' in height, and according to H.W.King Esq in 1845 of the Archaeological Society of Essex, the armour dates to around 1330 due to its design.

Up until the reign of Elizabeth I, the brass was intact, by 1740 the brass monument was gone, an old parishioner at that time remembers the monument prior to that date, when it was intact. The brass was at some point kept in a barn.

Major Spitty of Billericay was a wealthy land owner; by the 1820s St Margaret's Church was under major renovations, the then Church Warden handed over the brass to Major Spitty for safe keeping, by coincidence the Major had inherited Sadlers Farm at Bowers Gifford from his grandfather. The Spitty family having lived in Bowers Gifford since the 16th century, could the brass of Sir John Giffard been is the Spitty barn at some point? Major Spitty had a keen interest in history and archaeology, and contacted and presented the damaged brass to Reverend W.W. Tireman in 1855. Rev Tireman then had the brass restored and mounted on a new artificial slab, the original slab of stone disappeared possibly in the extension phase. By 1898 the whole brass had come loose, one leg becoming detached in two pieces, and was left in the church.

The Council of the Essex Archaeological Society having agreed to donate Two Guineas along with donations from church funds, the brass was a second time restored, this time being brazed together and mounted correctly. It was also agreed to outline the original missing, head, shoulders, leg and toe onto the stone slab, rather than commissioning replacements; the work was carried out by a Mr. Henry Young of Herongate.

What lies before us today is of the greatest quality and detail even after 700 years.

Present day worship and use 
St Margaret's is an Anglican church and is open for a weekly service every Sunday at 9am. The church also holds ceremonies for weddings, baptisms and funerals. A group of volunteers carries out grounds maintenance, church flower arranging and the general upkeep inside the building.

Rev David Ibiayo is the church minister and is also responsible for St Chad's church in nearby Vange.

References

External links
 St Margaret's Church

Grade II* listed churches in Essex